Joshua Michael Blainey Davison (born 16 September 1999) is an English professional footballer who plays as a forward for AFC Wimbledon.

Club career
Davison began his career with Peterborough United and enjoyed loan spells at both St Neots Town and Wisbech Town, before making a permanent move to Isthmian League side, Enfield Town ahead of the 2018–19 campaign. He made his debut during Enfield's 2–1 victory in the Alan Turvey Trophy, against Ware in September 2018. Following a brief loan spell with Barking, Davison returned to the club and went on to score his first goals for the club during a 4–1 victory over Burgess Hill Town in the Alan Turvey Trophy, netting a 76-minute hat-trick. Davison then went on to net three more times for the club before leaving Enfield in June 2019.

On 18 October 2019, following a trial period with the under-23s, Davison sealed a move to Championship side Charlton Athletic until the end of the season and made his first-team debut during a 2–2 draw with West Bromwich Albion, just a week after signing for the Addicks.

On 24 October 2020, Davison joined Woking until January 2021. On 13 January 2021, it was reported that Davison's loan had expired at Woking and he had returned to Charlton Athletic with the view to a loan move  to a League Two club. Six days later, he joined Forest Green Rovers on loan until the end of the season.

On 24 January 2022, Davison joined Swindon Town on loan for the rest of the 2021–22 season.

On 18 July 2022, Davison joined AFC Wimbledon on a permanent deal. He scored his first goals for Wimbledon when he scored twice in a 5-2 defeat to Mansfield Town on 16 August 2022.

Career statistics

References

External links

1999 births
Living people
English footballers
Association football forwards
Barking F.C. players
Charlton Athletic F.C. players
Enfield Town F.C. players
Peterborough United F.C. players
St Neots Town F.C. players
Wisbech Town F.C. players
Woking F.C. players
Forest Green Rovers F.C. players
Swindon Town F.C. players
AFC Wimbledon players
English Football League players
Isthmian League players
Southern Football League players